Neolitsea kedahense is a species of tree in the family Lauraceae. It is endemic to Kedah (hence the specific epithet kedahense) in Peninsular Malaysia. It belongs to lower risk bracket of the conservation status.

References

kedahense
Conservation dependent plants
Endemic flora of Peninsular Malaysia
Trees of Peninsular Malaysia
Taxonomy articles created by Polbot
Taxobox binomials not recognized by IUCN